Guglielma Pallavicini (rarely Wilhelmina; died 1358), the Lady of Thermopylae, was the last Pallavicino heir to rule in Bodonitsa. She ruled as Margrave of Bodonitza in 1311 – 1358. She was an infant when she succeeded her father Albert in 1311. She shared the margraviate with her mother Maria dalle Carceri and later with her stepfather Andrea Cornaro and her own husband Bartolomeo Zaccaria.

Life
The succession of all Latin fiefs in Greece was regulated at the time of Albert's death by the Book of the Customs of the Empire of Romania. By custom, the inheritance was split between the widow and daughter. Maria soon remarried to Andrea in order to protect the margraviate from Catalan incursions.

In 1327, Guglielma married the Genoese Bartolomeo Zaccaria, who had been captured while repelling, alongside Andrea Cornaro, an invasion by Alfonso Fadrique of Athens. In 1334, Bartolomeo died and Guglielma married Niccolò Zorzi, a Venetian. This marriage was especially important after the death of Cornaro, for it allowed her to remain in residence on Negroponte and to reconcile her claims to the castle of Larena with Venice's. In fact, Guglielma had contacted the Republic requesting one of their own as a husband. Zorzi arrived in Bodo Nitsa in 1335.

Guglielma and Niccolò continued the annual tribute of four destriers made to the Athenian Catalans. Peace did not attend their house, however. Venice continued the dispute over Larena and even sought the arbitration of the bailiff of Catherine II, Princess of Achaea, the legal suzerain of Euboea and Bodo Nitsa. The bailiff decided for Venice. This strained the marriage, with Guglielma accusing her husband of "cowardice and bias [towards Venice]." Guglielma further believed that he ignored the interests of her child by Bartolomeo, Marula, in favor of his own offspring. Guglielma had saved a large amount of money for her daughter but deposited it in a Venetian bank. The marchioness was finally whipped into a fury by the execution of her relative Manfredo, ordered by her husband. While the execution had been legal, Guglielma stirred the people against Zorzi, who was forced to flee to Negroponte.

The ensuing battle between husband and wife was anything but pretty. He went to Venice and appealed to the Senate, which demanded the return of him to his position or the relinquishing of his property, which she held. She refused and the bailiff of Negroponte was ordered to sever all communication between Bodo Nitsa and the island. The Catalans, who had initially been asked to stay out of the fray, were now pressed by Venice to intervene for peaceful settlement, along with Joan I of Naples, head of the Angevins, and Humbert II, Dauphin of Vienne, then a papal naval commander. This failing, Marula's money was confiscated and Niccolò compensated from the funds. Guglielma still refused to readmit her husband to her court. Despite the pleadings of Pope Clement VI, she preferred to heed the advice of her own nationalist bishop Natarus of Thermopylae

In 1354, Niccolò finally died and Guglielma immediately installed their eldest son, Francis, as co-ruler. With him ruling beside her, she was on good terms again with Venice and was included in the treaty subsequently signed with the Catalans. She died in 1358 and was succeeded by Francis. She left two other sons who later ruled Bodo Nitsa: Giacomo and Niccolò III.

References

Sources
 
Setton, Kenneth M. Catalan Domination of Athens 1311–1380. Revised edition. Variorum: London, 1975.

1300s births
1358 deaths
Christians of the Crusades
Guglielma
Guglielma
14th-century rulers in Europe
14th-century Italian nobility
14th-century women rulers
14th-century Italian women
14th-century Greek people
14th-century Greek women